Robert Graves (1895–1985) was an English poet, translator and novelist.

Robert, Bob, or Rob Graves may also refer to:

Robert Graves (engraver) (1798–1873), English engraver
Robert Graves (rugby) (1883–1958), Australian rugby player
Robert Edmund Graves (1835–1922), English librarian
Robert James Graves (1796–1853), Irish surgeon
Robert Muir Graves (1930–2003), American landscape architect
Robert Perceval Graves (1810-1893), Irish theologian, poet and biographer of Sir William Rowan Hamilton
Bob Graves (footballer) (Robert Edward Graves, born 1942), English football goalkeeper
Rob Graves (guitarist) (1955–1990), American guitarist and bassist
Rob Graves (Robert Douglas Graves, born 1973), American musician

See also
Robert Grave (died 1600), English priest